Khosrowjerd (also Romanized as Khosrow Gerd, Khosrow Jerd, and Khusro Gird; also known as Khosrow Gard Bāresh and Khosrow Gerd Abāresh) is a village in Qasabeh-ye Gharbi Rural District, in the Central District of Sabzevar County, Razavi Khorasan Province, Iran. In the 2006 census, its population was 1,325, in 421 families.

References 

Populated places in Sabzevar County